The Kingslayer is a collection of science fiction short stories by American writer L. Ron Hubbard.  It was first published in 1949 by Fantasy Publishing Company, Inc. in an edition of 1,200 copies.  The title story first appeared in this collection.  The other stories had previously appeared in the magazine Astounding SF.

Contents
 Preface
 "The Kingslayer"
 "The Beast"
 "The Invaders"
 "The Nate"

References

Sources

External links 
 

1949 short story collections
Science fiction short story collections
Works by L. Ron Hubbard
American short story collections
Fantasy Publishing Company, Inc. books